Mitch Michulka (born May 31, 1969) is an American former professional tennis player.

Michulka played collegiate tennis for the University of Texas and earned All-American honors for doubles in 1990, reaching the NCAA Division I doubles final with Michael Penman.

On the professional tour, Michulka competed mostly on the satellite circuit but had one title win on the ATP Challenger Tour, partnering Mark Petchey in the doubles at Kuala Lumpur in 1992.

ATP Challenger titles

Doubles: (1)

References

External links
 
 

1969 births
Living people
American male tennis players
Texas Longhorns men's tennis players
Tennis players from Dallas